State Route 76 (SR 76) is a  state highway in the southern part of the U.S. state of Georgia. It connects the Florida state line, south-southwest of Quitman, with the Nashville area, via Quitman, Morven, and Adel.

Route description

Starting at the Florida line south of Quitman in Brooks County, SR 76 heads north concurrent with U.S. Route 221 (US 221). Just south of Quitman, both roads merge with SR 333. In downtown Quitman, US 221 heads east, and SR 76/SR 333 stays concurrent. Just north of downtown, SR 76 splits off from SR 333. It then passes through the towns of Morven and Barney before entering Cook County.

SR 76 enters Cook County southwest of Adel. In town, it crosses, but does not junction with, Interstate 75 (I-75). In downtown, SR 76 runs concurrent with SR 37. They split east of Adel, and SR 76 heads northeast into Berrien County.

SR 76 enters Berrien County southwest of Nashville. Reaching downtown Nashville, it runs concurrently with US 129, SR 11, and SR 125 for a short distance. After splitting off, SR 76 heads east, jogs north, and then heads east until it terminates at SR 135.

The only portion of SR 76 that is part of the National Highway System, a system of routes determined to be the most important for the nation's economy, mobility, and defense, is the concurrency with US 84/SR 38 (on US 221/SR 333) in Quitman.

Major intersections

See also

References

External links

 

076
Transportation in Brooks County, Georgia
Transportation in Cook County, Georgia
Transportation in Berrien County, Georgia